Kettering Borough Council was the local authority for the Borough of Kettering in Northamptonshire, England was elected every four years. The district was abolished in 2021, with the area becoming part of North Northamptonshire.

Political control
From the foundation of the council in 1973 until its abolition in 2021, political control of the council was held by the following parties:

Leadership
The leaders of the council from 2003 until the council's abolition in 2021 were:

Council elections
1973 Kettering Borough Council election
1976 Kettering Borough Council election
1979 Kettering Borough Council election (New ward boundaries)
1983 Kettering Borough Council election
1987 Kettering Borough Council election
1991 Kettering Borough Council election
1995 Kettering Borough Council election
1999 Kettering Borough Council election (New ward boundaries)
2003 Kettering Borough Council election
2007 Kettering Borough Council election (New ward boundaries reduced the number of seats by 9)
2011 Kettering Borough Council election
2015 Kettering Borough Council election

Election results

Borough  result maps

Borough Council By-election results

May 1995 - May 1999

May 1999 - May 2003

May 2003 - May 2007

May 2007 - May 2011

May 2011 - May 2015

May 2015  - present

Parish & Town Council By-Election Results

May 2003 - May 2007

May 2007 - May 2011

May 2011 - May 2015

References

By-election results

External links
Kettering Borough Council

 
Council elections
Kettering
Kettering